Stadium seating or theater seating is a characteristic seating arrangement that is most commonly associated with performing-arts venues, and derives its name from stadiums, which typically use this arrangement.

Description
In stadium seating, most or all seats are placed higher than the seats immediately in front of them so that the occupants of further-back seats have less of their views blocked by those further forward. This is especially necessary in stadiums where the subject matter is typically best observed from above, rather than in-line or from below. In addition to sports venues and performing arts venues, many other venues that require clear audience views of a single area use stadium seating, including religious institutions, lecture halls, and movie theaters.

Alternatives
An alternative to stadium seating is to place the focal area at a higher level than the audience, so that the audience may look above those people in front of them to see, (like the green circle in the illustration, right), avoiding blocked sight-lines . One example of this is floor seating of a music venue which has a raised stage; seats are commonly all at an equal height on the actual floor of a venue, such as the floor seats at a concert held in a sports arena.

Because the increased angle of stadium seating, seats are typically (but not universally) installed on a stepped floor surface which also functions as a staircase in the aisles. This is as opposed to the common usage of a flat, often slightly sloped, floor used in many standard seating venues (such as many stage theaters). There has been some criticism of stadium seating because, due to the stepped layout, it is usually not possible for disabled people in wheelchairs to move about. Venues with stadium seating generally place handicapped seating among the row which is at the level of the concourse which feeds the seating area, leaving more space than rows above or below it, and leaving chair-less space(s) for wheelchairs.

Roller coasters
The trains on some roller coasters are also configured in tiers; this seating configuration is also sometimes called stadium seating. Three prominent examples of roller coasters whose trains use this type of seating are Millennium Force at Cedar Point, which opened in 2000, SheiKra at Busch Gardens Tampa Bay, which opened in 2005, and Griffon at Busch Gardens Williamsburg, which opened in 2007.

Theaters

Converting sloped-floor theaters to stadium seating often requires raising the ceiling and adding risers, so owners of movie theaters often judge conversion as not cost-effective.

See also
 Festival seating

References

Seating
Roller coaster technology